Liana Isakadze (born August 2, 1946) is a Georgian violinist.

Life
Born in Tbilisi, the capital of then-Soviet Georgia, Liana Isakadze entered music school at the age of seven. Under her teacher, Professor Shiukashvili, she excelled and at the age of nine played with the State Symphonic Orchestra. In 1956 she played her first solo violin concert. In 1956 she took part in the Moscow International Festival Competition. While younger than the other participants, she performed the adult program. The chairman of the festival was the famous violinist, David Oistrach.

D. Oistrakh played a big role in her life. It is he who insisted that she graduate from the Central Musical School a year early because she was accepted in his class at the Moscow State Conservatory without having to take the entrance exam.
 
After the Conservancy, Liana worked as Oistrakh's assistant for two years. She played in his orchestra when he conducted Beethoven and Tchaikovsky concertos.

In 1965 she was awarded the „Grand Prix“ at the Marguerite Long and Jacques Thibaud International Competition (Paris). In 1970 she participated at the Tchaikovsky Competition (Moscow) and received third place. In 1970 she took part in the Second Jean Sibelius International Violin Competition (Helsinki) where she shared the first prize with Pavel Kogan.
.

From 1964 to 1981 Liana played a Stradivarius violin which was a gift from the State Violin Collection in Moscow. Since 1965 she has played as a violin soloist with the orchestras of such outstanding conductors as Jiri Kout, Paavo Berglund, Vladimir Verbitsky, Jiří Bělohlávek, Valery Gergiev, Yehudi Menuhin, Eri Klas, Aleksandr Dmitriyev, Kurt Masur, Thomas Sanderling, Michail Jurowski, Jukka-Pekka Saraste, Hiroyuki Iwaki, Rudolf Kempe, Václav Neumann, Mariss Jansons, Yan Pascal Tortelier, Herbert Blomstedt, Gintaras Rinkevičius, Neeme Järvi, Dmitry Liss, Charles Dutoit.

Liana had an idea to create Festivals „Musicians are Joking“. From 1982 to 1989 she held these festivals which became popular.

She has played chamber music with notables such as Gustav Rivinius, Alexander Slobodyanik, Maxim Vengerov, Barbara Hendricks, Gidon Kremer, Franz Hummel, Natalia Gutman, Grigori Zhislin, Alexander Rudin, David Geringas, Frida Bauer, Maria Yudina, Igor Oistrakh, Dimitri Alexeev, Ivan Monighetti, Eduard Brunner, Yuri Bashmet, Alexander Kniazev, Alexei Lubimov, Justus Frantz, Arto Noras, Dmitry Sitkovetsky, Viktor Tretiakov and many others.

In 2009 she formed a Chamber Orchestra of Young Musicians of Southern and Eastern Europe. The German Foreign Ministry provided the support for this undertaking.

In 1983 Mrs. Isakadze was Artistic Director of various International Festivals, such as Eichstädt (Germany), „Night Serenades“ in Pitsunda (Abkhazia/Georgia), Open Air Festival in Batumi (Georgia) and „Festival of Arts“ in Borjomi (Georgia).

After 2011, Liana formed an ensemble – orchestra  „Virtuosi from Facebook“. The musicians who took part in this venture were famous musicians from various countries and they are Friends of Facebook. Its first performances took place at the Liana Isakadze Festivals of „Friends of Facebook” and „Night Serenades” in August 2011 in Batumi (Georgia).

After Soviet Union Liana lives in France: in Paris and Grasse.

From March 26, 1989 to December 26, 1991, Isakadze was also a People's Deputy of the Soviet Union Liana Isakadze has been awarded, inter alia, the title of People's Artist of the USSR (1988), Meritorious Artist of the Georgian SSR (1970), the State Prize of Georgia (1975, 1983, 2002), and the Order of Honour of Georgia (1998, 2002).

References

1946 births
Musicians from Tbilisi
Violinists from Georgia (country)
Conductors (music) from Georgia (country)
People's Artists of Georgia
People's Artists of the USSR
Living people
Women classical violinists
21st-century conductors (music)
21st-century women musicians
21st-century violinists
20th-century conductors (music)
20th-century women musicians
20th-century violinists
21st-century musicians from Georgia (country)
20th-century musicians from Georgia (country)